Goldtrix is a British house music duo from London, England, consisting of producers Daniel Goldstein and Matrix.  Goldtrix is a play on the artists names: Goldstein + Matrix.

In 2002, they hit number one on the U.S. Billboard Hot Dance Club Play chart with a cover of Jill Scott's "It's Love (Trippin')", their only release as of 2009. Singer Andrea Brown provided lead vocals.  The track reached #6 in the UK Singles Chart in February 2002.

Discography

Singles

See also
List of number-one dance hits (United States)
List of artists who reached number one on the US Dance chart

References

English house music duos